Aphanopetalum resinosum, known as the gum vine, is a small plant growing in rainforest or eucalyptus forest in eastern Australia, from north-east Victoria, through New South Wales and north to Queensland.

Usually a vine or small shrub growing in moist areas. Leaves 4 to 8 cm long, 1.5 to 3 cm wide, wavy edged or toothed. Leaf stem 2 to 5 mm long. The stems hairless, marked with lenticels. Four petal flowers form on cymes, petals 1 to 3 mm long. The fruit is a nut, 2 to 3 mm long.

Conservation status 
In Victoria it is listed as "vulnerable", being known only from a single collection near Mallacoota.

References

External links
 Aphanopetalum resinosum: Occurrence data from The Australasian Virtual Herbarium

Saxifragales
Saxifragales of Australia
Flora of New South Wales
Flora of Queensland
Flora of Victoria (Australia)
Taxa named by Stephan Endlicher
Plants described in 1839